In Greek mythology, the Amnisiades (Ancient Greek: Αμνισιαδες) were nymphs of the river Amnisus, Crete. Twenty of them formed part of Artemis's retinue, which was completed by sixty of the Okeanids.

Children of Potamoi
Naiads